Katherine Renee Shindle (born January 31, 1977) is an American actress, singer, dancer, and AIDS activist. She is currently serving as the President of the Actors' Equity Association. She was Miss America 1998 in 1998 and Miss Illinois in 1997.

Biography

Shindle was born in Toledo, Ohio, grew up in  Brigantine, New Jersey and Moorestown, New Jersey and attended high school at Bishop Eustace Preparatory School. She was a double major in sociology and theater (with a minor in musical theater) at Northwestern University. She has worked as an actress in New York since 1999. Shindle is also a licensed real estate agent.

Shindle appeared (as a replacement) in the Broadway production of Jekyll & Hyde as understudy for the role of Lucy and several other roles. After being cast by co-directors Sam Mendes and Rob Marshall, she played the role of Sally Bowles in the 1998 Broadway revival of Cabaret  on the national tour in 2000–2001, and on Broadway during June–July 2001. She played this role again in the Maltz Jupiter Theatre (Jupiter, Florida) production, starting in January 2012, and was nominated for a 2013 Carbonell Award. In 2007-2008 she appeared in the Broadway musical Legally Blonde as Vivienne Kensington. She played the Mad Hatter in the Broadway production of Wonderland in 2011.

She appeared in a concert version of Jeykll & Hyde in September 2004 at the Mohegan Sun Casino's Cabaret Theatre in Uncasville, Connecticut, playing Lucy. She then toured in the United States with the concert version, starting in September 2005, and recorded the role on the Jekyll & Hyde: Resurrection album.

In 2014, she wrote a memoir, Being Miss America: Behind the Rhinestone Curtain, published by the University of Texas Press.

In 2015, she defeated incumbent Nick Wyman for the presidency of the Actors' Equity Association.

Filmography

Theater

Broadway
 Jekyll & Hyde (1997) – A Young Girl; Bet; Bridesmaid; Housemaid; Nurse; Lucy u/s
 Cabaret (1998) – Sally Bowles
 Legally Blonde (2007) – Vivienne Kensington
 8 (2011) – Court Clerk
 Wonderland (2011) – The Mad Hatter
 Dracula, the Musical (2011) – Mina

National Tour 
 Cabaret (1999) – Sally Bowles
 Fun Home (2016) – Alison Bechdel

Regional 

 The Sting (2018) – Billie – Paper Mill Playhouse

Publications
Shindle, Kate. Being Miss America: Behind the Rhinestone Curtain, University of Texas Press, 2014.
Shindle, Kate. "The Real Housewives of Miss America." Daily Beast, September 21, 2014.
Shindle, Kate. "Running low on role models: Miss Nevada's out, Tara Conner's wobbly reign continues, and we're left wondering: What are beauty queens for, anyway?." Salon (website), December 26, 2006.

References

External links

  
 

1977 births
Living people
American musical theatre actresses
Bishop Eustace Preparatory School alumni
Miss America winners
Miss America 1998 delegates
Miss America Preliminary Talent winners
Northwestern University School of Communication alumni
Actresses from Toledo, Ohio
Actresses from New Jersey
20th-century American actresses
21st-century American actresses
People from Brigantine, New Jersey
People from Moorestown, New Jersey
21st-century American memoirists
American film actresses
American stage actresses
American women memoirists
HIV/AIDS activists
21st-century American women writers
Beauty pageant controversies
Presidents of the Actors' Equity Association